Mighty Mutanimals is a superhero team in the Teenage Mutant Ninja Turtles franchise. The team first appeared in the comic books series Teenage Mutant Ninja Turtles Adventures, where they formed as a team of mutant animals who were allies of the TMNT. Additional versions of the team and concept have appeared in subsequent incarnations of the franchise.

Fictional team biography

Archie Comics
Mighty Mutanimals was first published as a three-issue miniseries released between May and July 1991, which was later released in a collection in Winter 1991. A follow-up regular series totalling nine issues was released from April 1992 until June 1993.

The series was cancelled due to low sales, but the Mutanimals received their own 7-part backup-series in the pages of Teenage Mutant Ninja Turtles Adventures beginning in issue #48 and ending in issue #54. This series saw the assassination of the Mutanimals at the hands of the high-tech Gang of Four. Issues #55-57 continued the aftermath of their death and its effect on the Turtles' storyline. The creator of the Mutanimals, Ryan Brown, has stated that the reason for this decision was that the Mutanimals were supposed to be something completely different from the Teenage Mutant Ninja Turtles. Since the series, and proposed cartoon show, were cancelled, he no longer wanted his creation to become a second-fiddle act. Instead, he thought The Mutanimals could have a much more lasting impact if they were killed off.

The Mutanimals made a small cameo appearance in Tales of the TMNT #58. Dean Clarrain, Ken Mitchroney, Mike Kazaleh, and Garrett Ho all worked on the comic book miniseries.

Though the team was called "Mutanimals", implying that the members were all "mutant animals", only three were "true" mutants, Ray Fillet, Mondo Gecko, and reserve member Merdude. Leatherhead (Archie's version) was a human transformed by magic and so was Dreadmon, who was more or less a werewolf created by voodoo. Wingnut, Screwloose and Slash (Archie's version), were all aliens from Dimension X. And Jagwar was a demigod son of a human mother and jaguar spirit/god.

IDW Comics
A new version of the Mutanimals also appears in the Teenage Mutant Ninja Turtles IDW Comic series, in which Mondo Gecko, Man Ray and Slash reprise their roles as part of its membership. While Old Hob served as its leader, exclusive to this group are Herman the Hermit Crab, Pigeon Pete, and a mutant lioness named Sally Pride as well as a new interpretation of the Fred Wolf cartoon character Mutagen Man.

This version was created when Slash and Old Hob abduct former StockGen scientist Lindsey Baker and offer her a table filled with money if she helps to create a more coherent mutant army to protect the other mutants of New York City, since their own try at it resulted in Pigeon Pete who isn't at all that bright. Hob had obtained a large canister of mutagen and samples of Splinter's blood (containing the missing psychotropic compound). Slash willingly injects himself with some of Splinter's blood and the compound within makes Slash intelligent in moments, proving her theory correct. Lindsay then uses a gecko and hermit crab stolen by Hob and Slash to create Mondo Gecko and Herman, having successfully combined the compound with the mutagen. Old Hob later gained the services of Sally Pride, Man Ray, and Mutagen Man.

When Old Hob detonates a Mutagen bomb following Baxter Stockman becoming the Mayor of New York City causing anyone who was mutated to be placed in Mutant Town, Old Hob started selling some mutants to Karai in order to strengthen the Foot Clan. Old Hob's motives caused Mondo Gecko and Mutagen Man to leave the group. Though he does gain a mutant platypus named Puggle, a mutant raccoon named Bandit, a mutant porcupine named Diamond, and a mutant octopus named Stone as recruits. When Sally caught Diamond using brutality against some mutants, Sally fired her which also caused Old Hob to not rehire Diamond for the same reasons. Sally would later get dissatisfied with Old Hob's mutant trafficking and sides with the Ninja Turtles. Issue #110 had Old Hob's Mutantimals getting a new recruit in the form of a mutant ring-tailed lemur named Night. Issue #112 later have a mutant sloth named Chloe who supports Old Hob's campaign.

2012 TV series
An animated version of the Mighty Mutanimals debuted in the 2012 Teenage Mutant Ninja Turtles episode "Battle for New York". The team is led by Slash and composed of Monkey Brains, Leatherhead, and Pigeon Pete. Slash and Jack Kurtzman founded the team in order to combat the Kraang, who had conquered New York City. When the Turtles return, the two teams banded together to save New York from the Kraang, after settling their differences (largely regarding the animosity between Slash and Leonardo).

In "Clash of the Mutanimals", Slash and Rockwell were captured and brainwashed by Shredder as a test run for a mind control serum. The two would be freed by their teammates and the Turtles, and the eight mutants would fight The Shredder to a draw.

In "Dinosaur Seen In Sewers", Slash and Rockwell were injured by the crazed Triceraton Zog, and spent the remainder of the episode healing.

In the third-season finale titled "Annihilation: Earth!", the four Mutanimals fought alongside the Hamato and later Foot Clan as they tried to save the Earth from the invading Triceraton Empire. The group's efforts failed when Shredder betrayed them all by stabbing Splinter, and the four Mutanimals, along with all of the Turtle's allies (except for April O'Neil and Casey Jones) and enemies, then were sucked into a black hole to their deaths.

The Turtles subsequently spent the first half of the fourth season working to undo this turn of events. While they are unable to save the original versions of the Mutanimals and the others, they are able to save a second version of them in "Earth's Last Stand" where thanks to Splinter getting the heads up and intercepting Shredder's attack, the Turtles destroyed the timer to the Heart of Darkness, causing Earth's secondary annihilation to never occur.

In "Mutant Gangland," the Mutanimals with Mondo Gecko as their newest member stop the Fulci twins from obtaining new-and-improved weaponry. Rockwell telepathically sees into one of their minds and is shocked to learn that they are engineering these weapons to hunt down and destroy all mutants. The quarter head to warn the Turtles about this dangerous threat against all mutant-kind. Noticing that Pigeon Pete is missing, Donatello asks the Mutanimals where he is to which Slash replies "We don't talk about Pigeon Pete", indicating that soon after their victory of defeating the Triceratons, Pigeon Pete left the team for unknown reasons.

In "Requiem," the Mutanimals are in their hideout working how to plan their next attack on Super Shredder with the aid of Karai and Shinigami. They are interrupted by the arrival of Super Shredder who burns their hideout and defeats them with ease. They are rescued by April and Casey while Splinter and Leonardo save a seriously hurt Karai via CPR. Slash goes with Raphael, Splinter, April and Casey to track down Super Shredder while Leatherhead, Mikey, Leo, and Donnie go fight Fishface, Rahzar, Bebop, and Rocksteady at the amusement park. However, Slash is no match for Super Shredder's might and is knocked out. Leatherhead manages to beat Rahzar by dragging him underwater.

In the fourth season's finale titled "Owari," Rockwell, Leatherhead, Slash, and Pigeon Pete all appear at Splinter's funeral.

In "The Big Blowout," the Mutanimals (with Mona Lisa as their newest member) fights alongside the turtles, their 1980s counterparts, April, Casey, Karai, and Shinigami in a battle against the 1980s counterparts of the Shredder, Krang, and the present Bebop and Rocksteady. They soon face the return of Traag and Granitor until Bebop and Rocksteady came to save everyone.

Principal members

Dreadmon
Dreadmon is a character from the Teenage Mutant Ninja Turtles Adventures comic book and the Archie Comics' Mutanimals. The character is a native of South Africa. During the uprisings his father sent him and his mother to Jamaica where they suffered from poverty turning Dreadmon into a thief. One day he stole a talisman that transformed him into a part-man, part-red wolf creature with super speed. The creature was friends with the Ninja Turtles and he eventually joined the Mutanimals as second-in-command along with his best friend, Jagwar.

Dreadmon appears in the IDW comics as a mutant black-backed jackal.

Jagwar
Jagwar was the child of a union between the magical Jaguar Spirit and a tribal woman named Juntarra. After his mother left to continue her personal quest (completing "The Path of the Four Winds"), the twelve-year-old magical being lived in the rainforests of Brazil until his discovery by the TMNT in issue #14, when they were dropped off in his homeland by Cudley. His membership among the Mutanimals as their leader came soon after.

The IDW version was female and a member of the Pantheon.

Leatherhead

Leatherhead is a mutant alligator and hot-headed ally of the Ninja Turtles. He was created by Mirage Studios' artist Ryan Brown.

Mondo Gecko
Mondo Gecko is a mutant gecko and one of the first teenage allies of the Ninja Turtles, who shares a close relationship with Michelangelo. He was created by Mirage Studios' artist Ryan Brown.

In the Archie comics, Mondo Gecko had started out as a human skateboarder playing in a local heavy metal band. His girlfriend, Candy Fine, stuck by him even after some of Krang's discarded mutagen merged his DNA with that of his pet gecko as the band practiced in Shredder's former hideout. It was this version of the character whose story was incorporated into both the Mutanimals series and the action figure line.

In the IDW comics, Mondo Gecko was used as part of a mutant army that Old Hob established after he was mutated by Old Hob's ally Lindsey Baker.

In the 1987 cartoon, voiced by John Mariano. This version is a mutated gecko who was taken in by a gang led by Mr. X. Michelangelo convinced Mondo Gecko to turn on his leader. After this, Mondo Gecko ends his career as a criminal and moves to the sewers and becomes "neighbors" with the TMNT and Splinter.

In the 2012 series, Mondo (voiced by Robbie Rist), was named Jason, a teenage skateboarding star who was skateboarding home one night when a vial of mutagen fell on him. As the result of placing his pet leopard gecko Lars on his shoulder and was left out on the streets by his parents (who saw him as a freak and unfit to live with them any more), where he'd spent the rest of his days skateboarding until he was taken in as an errand boy by Mr. X. Making quick friends with Michelangelo and Casey Jones, Mondo eventually saw the true colors of his boss, and after racing against him, he defected from the Foot Clan and became friends with the Turtles.

In the upcoming 2023 film Teenage Mutant Ninja Turtles: Mutant Mayhem, he is voiced by Paul Rudd.

Ray Fillet
Ray Fillet (originally known as Man Ray) was once a marine biologist named Jack Finney who worked at the Burroughs Aquarium in New Jersey. He originated in the Archie Comics version of Teenage Mutant Ninja Turtles. Jack met the TMNT at the aquarium where he explained his origin. Jack was exposed to Mutagen after he climbed into a pipe on Bayview Beach that was polluting the water. Jack needed proof of the illegal dumping and after finding the mutagen coming out of the pipe he climbed into it to try to find an emissions leak. Bebop and Rocksteady had accidentally spilled a barrel of mutagen down the sewer which washed Jack into the river and he became a mutant manta ray. Ray first met the TMNT after first saving them from a torpedo that Shredder, Bebop, and Rocksteady shot at them from a submarine and defeating Shredder under water. When Ray brought Shredder to the shore Shredder kicked sand in his face and escaped. That is when the Turtles showed up. Later on, he joined up with the Mutanimals, and the group received a spin-off series from Archie comics entitled "The Mighty Mutanimals."

Ray Fillet was also made into an action figure, and appeared in one video game, Teenage Mutant Ninja Turtles: Tournament Fighters for the Sega Genesis. Ray also saved the Turtles from the Shredder in issue number three of the 1989 Ralston Purina Teenage Mutant Ninja Turtles cereal mini comic book series. He was created by Mirage Studios' artist Ryan Brown.

In the IDW Comics, there is a variation of Ray Fillet named Ray who is a mutant manta ray. He alongside Sally Pride were prisoners of the Null Group at a train station until they were freed and joined Old Hob's Mutanimals.

In the 1987 series, a character based on Ray appeared in the episode "Rebel Without a Fin" voiced by Pat Fraley. This character was originally intended to be Ray Fillet according to Ryan Brown.  This version is a humanoid fish with manta ray-like wings and an octopus tentacle for a tail. He was created by Dr. Polidorius to serve him and assist with his plans to destroy the city. Ray has many abilities of a fish like the electricity of an electric eel, the quills of a scorpionfish, and the inflation of a blowfish. Ray began planting explosives to sink New York City underwater so Dr. Polidorius could create a city populated by other fish mutants. Dr. Polidorius also turned April O'Neil into a similar mutant. During a fight, Dr. Polidorius' lair is flooded and Ray escapes into the ocean while the Turtles, April, and Dr. Polidorius are distracted.

In the upcoming 2023 film Teenage Mutant Ninja Turtles: Mutant Mayhem, he is voiced by Post Malone.

Wingnut and Screwloose
Wingnut is a heroic humanoid alien bat and Screwloose is his partner,  an alien mosquito. They were created by Mirage Studios artist Ryan Brown and introduced in TMNT Adventures, Some versions of them were Mutants. 

The pair are not mutants, but the only surviving members of an alien race after Krang invaded their planet Dexion V in the Huanu system and wiped out everyone but those two. Screwloose's sting would calm the sometimes insane Wingnut. According to Screwloose, their two species shared a symbiotic relationship. Wingnut's species would provide Screwloose's with blood, while Screwloose's species' bite was the only means of the other species' sleep.
Wingnut originally made his debut as a bad guy and an ally of Shredder in issue number two of the 1989 Teenage Mutant Ninja Turtles cereal mini-comic book by Ralston Purina.

In the 1987 cartoon, Wingnut (voiced by Rob Paulsen) and Screwloose (voiced by Townsend Coleman) are a pair of terrorist mutants from the Dimension X planet Flagenon who tried to brainwash the children of their homeworld into invading Earth only to be stopped by the Turtles.

A variation of Wingnut appeared in the video game Teenage Mutant Ninja Turtles: Mutants in Manhattan voiced by Jim Meskimen. This version is a servant of General Krang. He fights the Turtles at the top of a construction site.

In the 2012 series, Wingnut voiced by Daran Norris and Jeff Bennett respectively. They are superhero characters from Michelangelo's comic book who were brought to life by April O'Neil's crystal fragment of the Aeon's mystical Sol Star.

In the upcoming 2023 film Teenage Mutant Ninja Turtles: Mutant Mayhem, Wingnut will be voiced by Natasia Demetriou.

Old Hob
Old Hob is a character introduced in the IDW comics first as an antagonist to the turtles and then later becomes an anti-hero and founded the Mighty Mutanimals to protect Mutants.

Sally Pride
Sally Pride is a female lion mutant from the IDW comics.

Lindsey Baker
Lindsey Baker is a young scientist and the only human member of the Mighty Mutanimals. She is also revealed to be a lesbian.

Herman
A mutant hermit crab from the IDW comics. Created by Old Hob to serve in his mutant army. The dumpster on his back is filled with a variety of heavy weapons.

Mutagen Man
Mutagen Man is a mutant character in the franchise who suffers a bizarre encounter with mutagen that exposes his internal organs and resides in a special robotic suit.

In the 1987 cartoon, he is voiced by Rob Paulsen and was introduced as Seymour Gutz, a nerdy mailman who became dismembered upon falling into a special vat of mutagen.

In the 2012 cartoon, Mutagen Man (voiced by Roger Craig Smith) was introduced as Timothy, a young ineffective ice cream vendor who witnesses the Turtles' first battle with Baxter Stockman and dedicates himself to fighting crime as a wannabe superhero in a turtle costume called "The Pulverizer". When he was exposed to mutagen, he dissolved into a 6 ft. mutant blob of mutagen with floating organs and a disintegrating touch that was the result of having not coming in contact with any animal or plant.

In the IDW comics, Mutagen Man is a failed attempt at combining several different animal breeds into one mutant. When The Mutanimals found him strapped to a bed, they tried to free him. Although he is told that he's being saved, Mutagen Man has a different idea of the term by forcing Old Hob's gun to his dome and urging him to fire. Hob refuses and they all escape the facility together. Later, Mutagen Man was given the name "Seymour Guts" by Mondo Gecko.

Pigeon Pete
Pigeon Pete is a mutant Pigeon that appeared in the 2012 series and the IDW comics both versions being a member of the Mighty Mutanimals.

Reserve members

Merdude
Merdude is a merman-like creature.

In the Archie Comics, Alim was a boy who was born 5,000 years ago. When Alim fell into the sea, he ended up in a part where mutagen was and became a mutant merman. Many years later, Merdude befriended the Teenage Mutant Ninja Turtles and later became a reserve member of the Mighty Mutanimals.

Merdude appears in the 1987 Teenage Mutant Ninja Turtles episode "Atlantis Awakes" voiced by Kevin Schon. In this show, Merdude's real name is Alim Coelacanth who is a deformed merman and the true ruler of Atlantis.

Slash

Allies

Candy Fine
Candy Fine is Mondo Gecko's girlfriend in the Archie TMNT Universe. Devoted to Mondo and loving him until the end, she remained at his side after he was mutated, and accompanied him when he joined the Mighty Mutanimals. Aside from Slash, she was the only survivor of Null's Mutanimal massacre in the TMNT Adventure's Terracide storyline. She listens to nothing except 1980s heavy metal music which she loved most of all, and attended every one of her lover's practices and gigs.

Ninjara
Ninjara, real name Umeko, is a kunoichi, from an ancient race of humanoid foxes living on a hidden island off the coast of Japan. She ended up becoming a thief and assassin for the villainous dog-man Chien Kahn, but then had a change of heart when she met the Turtles, and fell in love with Raphael. She helped out on many missions, from the Far and the Middle East to Dimension X. Her family life was explored more in detail when her younger brother managed to track her down and convince her to come back home. The Turtles discovered the island was hidden by fog banks, but despite this, it had been discovered by an opportunistic, greedy hunter. She was a powerful member of the team from issue #29 until issue #70.

Splinter

The Teenage Mutant Ninja Turtles

Other allies

Glublubs
Undersea allies of Man Ray.

Kid Terra
A former mercenary styling himself after Old West gunfighters, Kid Terra was originally the chief henchman of the nihilistic industrialist Null, overseeing several of his environment-destroying projects (TMNT Adventures #15). During his second clash with the Turtles and Man Ray, he accidentally killed Man Ray's friend Bubbla the Glublub (TMNT Adventures #16). This deed and Null's insidious plan to sell Earth to the destructive alien race called the Malignoids finally turned Kid against Null, and his subsequent aid proved decisive in saving the Earth (TMNT Adventures #19 and Mighty Mutanimals miniseries #1, #2 and #3). He remained a staunch ally of the Turtles and the Mutanimals afterwards, assisting them in many missions against Null's schemes.

Re-releases
The original Mighty Mutanimals miniseries and issue six of the regular series were reprinted by IDW in their Teenage Mutant Ninja Turtles Adventures collections.

References

External links
Ryan Brown's Mighty Mutanimals blog

Archie Comics titles
Teenage Mutant Ninja Turtles comics
Teenage Mutant Ninja Turtles characters
Comics spin-offs
1991 comics debuts
1993 disestablishments
Fictional mutants
Extraterrestrial characters in comics
Comics set in Brazil